Eucalyptus persistens is a species of small tree that is endemic to Queensland. It has rough, dark grey bark, lance-shaped adult leaves, flower buds in groups of seven, white flowers and cup-shaped or barrel-shaped fruit.

Description
It has rough, dark grey bark on the trunk and branches. The flower buds are mostly arranged on the ends of branchlets on a branched peduncle in groups of seven. Flowering occurs between April and October and the flowers are white.

Taxonomy
Eucalyptus persistens was first formally described in 1991 by Lawrie Johnson and Ken Hill in the journal Telopea, from material they collected in 1984. The specific epithet (persistens) is from Latin, meaning "persisting", referring to the outer operculum and rough bark.

Distribution
This tree occurs in north-eastern Queensland between Laura, Mareeba, Hughenden, Forsayth and Marlborough.

Conservation status
This eucalypt is listed as "least concern" under the Queensland Government Nature Conservation Act 1992

See also
List of Eucalyptus species

References

Trees of Australia
persistens
Myrtales of Australia
Flora of Queensland
Plants described in 1991